Shofar: An Interdisciplinary Journal of Jewish Studies is a triannual peer-reviewed academic journal published by Purdue University Press on behalf of the university's Jewish Studies Program. Shofar is the official journal of the Midwest and Western Jewish Studies Associations. The journal publishes original, scholarly work and reviews a wide range of recent books in Judaica.

History 
The journal was originally established as a departmental newsletter by Joseph Haberer in 1981. Over time, it developed into a peer-reviewed journal.

See also 
 Journal of Jewish Studies

References

External links 
 
 Shofar on the Purdue University Jewish Studies Program website

Judaic studies journals
Publications established in 1982
Quarterly journals
English-language journals
Purdue University
Academic journals published by university presses of the United States
Academic journals associated with universities and colleges of the United States
1982 establishments in Indiana
Multidisciplinary academic journals